Aulonemia aristulata is a species of bamboo.

References

aristulata